Conrad Phillip Kottak (born October 6, 1942, in Atlanta, Georgia) is an American anthropologist. Kottak is currently a professor emeritus of anthropology at the University of Michigan, where he has been teaching since 1968. He received his Ph.D. from Columbia University, and he did extensive research in Brazil and Madagascar, visiting societies there and writing books about them.

He then wrote several textbooks, including Window on Humanity: A Concise Introduction to Anthropology; Madagascar: Society and History, and Anthropology: The Exploration of Human Diversity and Cultural Anthropology, which are often used by colleges and high schools in the United States. He believes that various American legends and stories, such as Star Trek, Star Wars and the Thanksgiving story are growing into a type of mythology which someday might be comparable to Greek, Roman, or other stories which today are considered to be myths.

Kottak has received several honors for his work. Among these awards is an excellence in teaching award by the College of Literature, Sciences, and the Arts of the University of Michigan in 1992, and the American Anthropological Association (AAA)/Mayfield Award for Excellence in the Undergraduate Teaching of Anthropology in 1999. He was elected to the membership of the National Academy of Sciences in 2008. According to the Open Syllabus Project, Kottak is the most frequently cited author on college syllabi for anthropology courses.

Books
Madagascar: Society and History (1986, Carolina Academic Press / Wenner-Gren Foundation for Anthropological Research)
Researching American Culture: A Guide for Student Anthropologists (1982, The University of Michigan Press)
The Past and Present: History, Ecology, and Cultural Variation in Highland Madagascar (1980, The University of Michigan Press)
Prime-Time Society: An Anthropological Analysis of Television and Culture (October 2009, Left Coast Press)
Assault on Paradise: Social Change in a Brazilian Village (1999, McGraw-Hill)
Anthropology: The Exploration of Human Diversity and Cultural Anthropology (2003)
Physical Anthropology and Archaeology (2003, McGraw-Hill)
Mirror for Humanity: A Concise Introduction to Cultural Anthropology (McGraw-Hill, 2013 15th Edition)
On Being Different: Diversity and Multiculturalism in the North American Mainstream (with co-author Kathryn A. Kozaitis) (2003, McGraw-Hill)

The list is from his profile at umich.

References
Kottak, Conrad. Window on Humanity: A Concise Introduction to Anthropology. "About the Author" (pages xxvii-xxviii)

1942 births
American anthropologists
Living people
Members of the United States National Academy of Sciences
University of Michigan faculty